Bridger Bowl is a ski area in the western United States, near Bozeman, Montana. It serves the local population of Gallatin County, including Montana State University.

It provides locals with affordable skiing, great terrain, and outstanding snowfall. The ski area and mountain range are named after the noted mountain man Jim Bridger, and are accessed from state highway 86.

In addition to the existing base lodge and a mid-mountain lodge, a new main lodge opened in 2005 at the base area.

Since 1988, local residents have been alerted to the arrival of fresh snow by a flashing blue beacon atop the Baxter Hotel in downtown Bozeman. Activated every time Bridger Bowl accumulates  of new snow, it remains on for 24 hours. Maintenance of the light is a priority, and only once in 20 years was it out of operation for two days.

Bridger Bowl opened the new Schlasman's chairlift for the 2008–09 season, the first lift-served terrain expansion in 30 years. A reconditioned 1976 Doppelmayr double chair, it was previously the "Peruvian" lift at Snowbird in Utah. To ride this lift, skiers are required to carry an avalanche transceiver; partners and shovels are highly recommended.

For the 2013–14 season, Bridger unveiled its new Powder Park and Alpine chair lifts. These brand-new lifts tripled the uphill capacity (3,300 vs. 1,100/hr) compared to the "old Alpine" center-pole double chair that was retired in 2013.

Bridger Bowl is noted for its expert-only skiing terrain known as "The Ridge". There are six sections of the ridge known as Schlasman's, D Route, C Route, B Route, A route, and Northwest/Hidden Gully Areas. In order to ski or snowboard the ridge, an avalanche beacon and shovel are required; most of the ridge is hiking terrain.

Montana State has hosted the NCAA Skiing Championships eight times (1960, 1983, 1985, 1996, 1998, 2008, 2012, 2020), all at Bridger Bowl, with cross-country events at adjacent Bohart Ranch.

List of runs 
Difficulty ratings

References

External links

Buildings and structures in Gallatin County, Montana
Ski areas and resorts in Montana
Tourist attractions in Gallatin County, Montana
Skiing in Montana